Vidyanagar  is a village within the jurisdiction of the Bishnupur police station in the Bishnupur II CD block in the Alipore Sadar subdivision of the South 24 Parganas district in the Indian state of West Bengal.

Geography

Area overview
The Alipore Sadar subdivision is the most urbanized part of the South 24 Parganas district. 59.85% of the population lives in the urban areas and 40.15% lives in the rural areas. In the southern portion of the subdivision (shown in the map alongside) there are 15 census towns. The entire district is situated in the Ganges Delta and the subdivision, on the east bank of the Hooghly River, is an alluvial stretch, with industrial development.

Note: The map alongside presents some of the notable locations in the subdivision. All places marked in the map are linked in the larger full screen map.

Location
 
Vidyanagar is not identified as a separate place in 2011 census. As per the map of the Bishnupur II CD block in the District Census Handbook, it could be a part of either Chanddandaha or Maukhali.

Transport
A short stretch of local roads link Vidyanagar to the National Highway 12.

Education
Vidyanagar College, established in 1963, is affiliated with the University of Calcutta. It offers honours courses in Bengali, English, political science, history, philosophy, economics, physics, chemistry, mathematics, botany, zoology,  and general courses in arts, science and commerce.

Vidyanagar Multipurpose School is a coeducational institution affiliated with the West Bengal Board of Secondary Education.

Vidyanagar Girls School is girls only institution affiliated with the West Board of Secondary Education.

Healthcare
Amtala Rural Hospital, with 50 beds, at Amtala, is the major government medical facility in the Bishnupur II CD block.

References

Villages in South 24 Parganas district